Franklin Bartlett (September 10, 1847 – April 23, 1909) was an American lawyer and politician who served two terms as a U.S. Representative from New York from 1893 to 1897.

Biography
Bartlett was born in Uxbridge, Worcester County, Massachusetts, the son of William Osborne and Agnes Fredericka Herreshoff Willard Bartlett. He graduated from the Brooklyn Polytechnic Institute, Harvard University, and Columbia Law School. He also attended Exeter College (Oxford University, England). He was a member of Delta Kappa Epsilon. He married Bertha King Post on June 4, 1872, and they had one daughter Bertha King Bartlett.

Career
Bartlett served as a member of the constitutional commission of the State of New York in 1890. He served as delegate to the Democratic National Convention in 1892.

Congress 
Bartlett was elected as a Democrat to the Fifty-third and Fifty-fourth Congresses, and served from March 4, 1893 to March 3, 1897. He was an unsuccessful candidate for reelection in 1896 to the fifty-fifth Congress.

Spanish-American War 
During the war with Spain in 1898, Bartlett served as colonel of volunteers. He was a member of the Sons of the Revolution and the Society of Colonial Wars.

Death
Bartlett died of a kidney disorder in Manhattan, New York County, New York, on April 23, 1909. He is interred at Green-Wood Cemetery, Brooklyn, New York. His brother was Chief Judge Willard Bartlett.

References

External links

 

1847 births
1909 deaths
Burials at Green-Wood Cemetery
Polytechnic Institute of New York University alumni
Harvard University alumni
People from Uxbridge, Massachusetts
Democratic Party members of the United States House of Representatives from New York (state)

Members of the United States House of Representatives from New York (state)
19th-century American politicians
General Society of Colonial Wars